The Missing Links is a 1916 American silent crime film directed by Lloyd Ingraham and starring Thomas Jefferson, Elmer Clifton, and Robert Harron.

The film tells of a murder in a small rural town. The major suspects are two brothers, Horace and Henry (Clifton and Harron). Each believes the other to be guilty, so confesses to save their brother.

The film was written by Bernard McConville and D. W. Griffith, who also produced it. It premiered on January 16, 1916 as a production of the Fine Arts Film Company. It was distributed by Triangle Distributing. The Missing Links was Norma Talmadge's first film for Triangle.

It is now considered a lost film, as no known reels exist today.

Actors

References

External links 
 
 
  The Missing Links  Silent on the site 
 The Missing Links TCM Movie Database

1916 films
1916 lost films
American black-and-white films
American crime drama films
American silent feature films
Films directed by Lloyd Ingraham
Lost American films
1916 crime drama films
Lost drama films
1916 crime films
1910s English-language films
1910s American films
Silent American drama films